Zhang Yaokun (born 17 April 1981) is a retired Chinese footballer.

Club career
Zhang Yaokun started his football career in 1998 with Dalian Shide; however, due to an ankle fracture, he struggled to establish himself within the team and it was only once he overcame his long term injury did he start to become a regular. He later became an integral member of the defense and helped Dalian in their dominance within Chinese football by winning league titles in the 2001 season and the 2002 season as well as the Chinese FA Cup in 2001. After Dalian had a disappointing 2004 season, Vladimir Petrović came in as the new manager and would loan out Zhang to Sichuan Guancheng during the 2005 season where he quickly established himself as a key member of the club. He returned to Dalian the following season where he continued to be a key member of the squad and would go on to become their captain.

On 18 December 2012, Zhang transferred to fellow Chinese Super League side Guangzhou R&F. He made his debut for the club on 9 March 2013 in a 4-2 loss against Liaoning Whowin.
On 26 February 2017, Zhang transferred to League One side Wuhan Zall.

On 12 November 2018, Zhang Yaokun publicly announced his retirement from professional football right after Wuhan Zall successfully promoted to Chinese Super League.

International career
Zhang was called-up to the Chinese national team for the 2004 AFC Asian Cup where he made several appearances coming on as a substitute and playing in numerous positions in defence. He continued to be a regular for the squad that qualified for the 2007 AFC Asian Cup and he and Li Weifeng were the first-choice centre back pairing during the tournament.

Career statistics

Club statistics

International goals
Results list China's goal tally first.

Honours

Club
Dalian Shide
Chinese Jia-A League: 1998, 2000, 2001, 2002
Chinese FA Cup: 2001
Chinese FA Super Cup: 2000, 2002

Wuhan Zall
China League One: 2018

International
China PR national football team
East Asian Football Championship: 2005

Individual
Chinese Super League Team of the Year: 2004

References

External links

Player profile at sodasoccer.com

1981 births
Living people
Chinese footballers
Footballers from Dalian
China international footballers
Dalian Shide F.C. players
Sichuan Guancheng players
Guangzhou City F.C. players
Wuhan F.C. players
Chinese Super League players
China League One players
2004 AFC Asian Cup players
2007 AFC Asian Cup players
Footballers at the 2002 Asian Games
Association football defenders
Asian Games competitors for China